Katerini (Kateríni) is a city and municipality in northern Greece, the capital city of Pieria regional unit in Central Macedonia, Greece. It lies on the Pierian plain, between Mt. Olympus and the Thermaikos Gulf, at an altitude of 14 m. The municipal unit of Katerini has a population of 85,851 (according to the 2014 census) and it is the second most populous urban area at the Region of Macedonia after Thessaloniki. The close distance between two cities (68 km), has been beneficial for Katerini's development over recent years. Katerini is accessible from the main Thessaloniki–Athens highway GR-1/E75 (with the Katerini's South, East and North interchanges) and the Egnatia Odos to the north. It is served by Intercity, Proastiakos (Suburban Railway) and local trains on the main railway line from Athens to Thessaloniki and there is a comprehensive regional and national bus service with its hub in the city.

A popular tourist destination in northern Greece, Katerini is close to the sea (7 km) and to several archaeological sites of great interest such as the ancient city of Dion (5th century BC, 17 km away), the ancient Leivithra (27 km away),ancient Pydna (16km away) and the Castle of Platamon. The beaches of Korinos, Paralia and Olympiaki Akti (or Katerinoskala) are visited by both Greek and foreign tourists during the Summer. The base of Mount Olympus and the town of Litochoro, are at a distance of around 20 km from the centre of Katerini, whereas there is the Ski center of Elatochori in Mount Pieria at a distance of 33.4 km from the city's centre.

Name and history
The origin of the name is obscure. Since the 13th century, travellers as well as maps record the existence of a settlement called Hatera (Ἅτηρα), which may have been the origin of the modern name. Thus Felix Beaujour recorded its name as "Katheri", while François Pouqueville gives the name of the settlement as "Kateri Hatera". According to another theory, the city derives its name from the small chapel dedicated to Saint Catherine (Aikaterini in Greek) to the east of the city, dating to at least the early 19th century. The latter hypothesis influenced official usage in Greek, where the city is found as "Aikaterini" or "Agia Aikaterini" until the early 20th century, when the vernacular name Katerini prevailed.
 
According to the reports of travellers, at the turn of the 19th century, the city had four to five thousand inhabitants, mostly Greeks. In 1806, William Martin Leake recorded 100 hearths, while four years later Daniel recorded 140. For the remainder of the 19th century, the number of homes remained steady at about 300, with a population in 1900 of 2,070 Orthodox Christians and 600 Muslims.

The city was captured by the Greek 7th Infantry Division on 16 October 1912, during the First Balkan War, and has been part of Greece since then. With the population exchange between Greece and Turkey in 1923, the city's Muslims left, and Greek refugees, particularly from Eastern Thrace and Greek Evangelicals from Asia Minor, took their place, almost doubling the city's population from 5,540 in 1920 to 10,138 in 1928.

Geography

Administrative division
The municipality of Katerini was formed at the 2011 local government reform by the merger of the following 6 former municipalities, that became municipal units of the newly formed Katerini municipality.

Climate
Katerini has a Mediterranean climate that is characterised by warm to hot, dry summers and cool and more humid winters (Köppen climate classification: Csa).

Local delicacies
Katerini is located near several villages which are renowned for their high quality products. In particular kiwis and cherries are one of the more important productions in the region, as well as strawberries. There is also cultivation of tobacco in the region and lot of people spend considerable resources for its development and for exports of the product.

Politics

Local Government
The mayor of Katerini is Konstantinos Koukodimos, a member of the Political Committee of New Democracy, who was elected in the 2019 local elections.

Economy

Katerini is the administrative and economic centre of Pieria. The Chamber of commerce and industry of Pieria is based in Katerini. The same applies for the Union of Agricultural Cooperatives of Pieria and the Union of hotel owners of Pieria.

Agriculture
Katerini lies in the middle of a plain and thus, it is greatly an agricultural city. As of 2000 26,775 people were occupied in agriculture, in Pieria. The Union of Agricultural Cooperatives of Pieria has 9,000 members, of which 2,000 grow tobacco. Kiwifruit is also produced in Katerini.

Tourism
Katerini is a popular tourist destination, that attracts tourist both from Greece and abroad. Within the boundaries of the municipality, there are over 230 hotels that can accommodate more than 8,600 people. The vast majority of the tourist infrastructure lie in Paralia and Olympiaki Akti and it also includes tens of tavernas and cafes. Winter tourism has started developing in the area, since the construction of the Elatochori ski resort. Katerini is surrounded by ancient archaeological sites as Dion, Leivithra, Pydna, Louloudies and Platamon Castle which are worth a visit.

Transport

Local transport 
The national bus service is from the Katerini long-distance bus station of coach KTEL. The local bus lines serve the connection between Katerini and its nearby settlements. The bus hub is in Katerini and it has lines towards Moschochori, Paralia, Olympiaki Akti, Dion, Pieria, Aronas and Nea Trapezounta. These lines serve all the settlements that lie between Katerini and the aforementioned final destinations.

Road transport
Katerini is served by A1 and National Road 1 that run north-south from Evzonoi to Athens. The connection between Katerini and Elassona is served by National Road 13. Single carriageways run from Katerini to every settlement of the Pieria. Bus lines, delivered by the Intercity KTEL of Pieria, connect Katerini directly with Athens, Thessaloniki, Elassona, Alexandreia and all the settlements of Pieria that are not served by the Urban KTEL of Katerini. There are also privately held international bus lines that connect Katerini with several cities in Albania and Bulgaria.

Rail links
Katerini railway station is located just outside the city centre. The main line of the Greek railway system that connects Athens with Thessaloniki passes through Katerini. As a result, the city is connected directly with Larisa and Thessaloniki via the Proastiakos. It is also connected with Athens and all the intermediate stations by Intercity train lines.

Demographics

Historical population

Local communities

Katerini is home to a significant Aromanian population that exceeds 3,000 people. Aromanians of Katerini mainly descend from nearby Aromanian settlements of Livadi and Kokkinopilos, and in lesser numbers from Samarina, Moscopole, Avdella, Perivoli and Smixi. According to some sources the Aromanians formed a majority amongst the city's Christian population in the beginning of the 20th century.

Immigrants
As of 2001, the Municipal unit of Katerini (then Municipality of Katerini) was home to 2,794 foreign nationals (4.9% of the total population). Amongst them the most populous ethnic group was Albanians (2.5%) followed by Georgians (0.5%), Russians (0.4%) and Bulgarians (0.3%).

Religion 
The Diocese of Metropolis of Kitros, Katerini and Platamonas has 16 congregations within the city of Katerini. There is also an Old Calendarist church in the city. Katerini has a relatively numerous Protestant community, as a result of the organised settlement of Evangelical Greek refugees from Asia Minor and Pontus (region). Today the Greek Evangelical Church of Katerini has almost 1,100 followers. Other Protestant denominations, that have a church within the city, are the Free Apostolic Church of Pentecost, the Greek Apostolic Church of Pentecost and the Seventh-day Adventist Church. The Protestant community is fully integrated in the life of the city, but in the past there were tensions between the Evangelical community and the Greek Orthodox majority. These tensions led to the arson of the Evangelical Church of Katerini from a Greek Orthodox mob in March 1930.

Public education
The Katerini city public schools is a part of the public education system consisting of member schools include, the Preschool, Primary, Secondary (Katerini City Gymnasium, Katerini City High School, and others), Post Upper Secondary, and Higher Education.

Sports

Football

Katerini is represented by two football teams in the national leagues; Pierikos, a club currently playing in the Football League 2, and the women's football club of Pierides Muses, playing in the Women's Second National Division.

Other Sports
Pierikos-Archelaos B.C. currently competes in the A2 League, the second tier of Greek basketball. GAS Archelaos plays in the A2 League the second tier of the Greek handball league system.

Notable people
 Eleni Chatziliadou (born 1993), athlete, karate world champion 2018
 Giorgos Fourniadis (born 1937), actor and director
 Dimitris Giannoulis (born 1995), Greek footballer
 Stelios Malezas (born 1985), Greek footballer 
 Christina Moschi (born 2002), 10m air pistol athlete of the Archelaos Katerinis Sport Club, Member of the Hellenic Shooting Federation (HSF) and Hellenic National Shooting Team 
 Katerina Nikolaidou (born 1992), rower athlete, 4th place 2016 Olympic Games, 2nd place in the lightweight single sculls at the 2013 World Rowing Championships
 Konstantinos Papachronis (1977–2008), actor
 Kyriakos Papadopoulos (born 1992), Greek footballer
 Yannis K. Semertzidis, physicist
 Maria Tsionoglou (born 1991), 10m air pistol athlete of the Archelaos Katerinis Sport Club, Member of the Hellenic Shooting Federation (HSF) and Hellenic National Shooting Team
 Alexandros Tziolis (born 1985), Greek footballer

International relations

Katerini is twinned with: 

 Brăila, Romania
 Čačak, Serbia
 Maintal, Germany
 Moosburg, Austria
 Surgut, Russia

See also
List of settlements in the Pieria regional unit
Folklore Museum (Katerini)

References

External links

  Municipality of Katerini

 
Greek prefectural capitals
Populated places in Pieria (regional unit)